This list includes American politicians at the state and local levels who have been convicted of felony crimes committed while in office.

At the bottom of the article are links to related articles which deal with politicians who are involved in federal scandals (political and sexual), as well as differentiating among federal, state and local convictions. Also excluded are crimes which occur outside the politician's tenure in office unless they specifically stem from acts during his time of service.

Entries are arranged by date, from most current to less recent, and by state.

2020–present

Arkansas 
 State Senator Jeremy Hutchinson (R) sentenced to 46 months of prison after pleading guilty to bribery, tax fraud, wire fraud, and conspiracy. He was previously sentenced to 19 days in jail for making false statements. (2022)

California

Local 
 Los Angeles Councilman Mitchell Englander (R) was sentenced to one year and one day in prison for obstructing a probe into his alleged corruption. (2021)

 Los Angeles Councilman Jose Huizar (D) plead guilty to one count of conspiracy to violate the Racketeer Influenced and Corrupt Organizations (RICO) Act and one count of tax evasion. (2023)

Connecticut 
 State Representative Michael DiMassa (D) pleaded guilty to conspiracy for stealing COVID relief funds. (2022)

Delaware 
 Auditor of Delaware Kathy McGuiness (D) convicted of conflict of interest and official misconduct. (2022)

Hawaii 
 State Senator J. Kalani English (D) convicted of bribery. (2022)
 State Representative Ty Cullen (D) convicted of bribery. (2022)

Georgia 
 Insurance Commissioner of Georgia Jim Beck (R) convicted of fraud. (2021)

Idaho 
 State Representative Aaron von Ehlinger (R) convicted of rape. (2022)
 State Representative John Green (R) convicted of fraud. (2020)

Illinois 
 State Representative Luis Arroyo (D) convicted of fraud. (2022)
 State Senator Tom Cullerton (D) convicted of embezzlement. (2022)
 State Representative Eddie Acevedo (D) convicted of tax evasion. (2021)
 State Senator Terry Link (D) was convicted of tax evasion. (2020)
 State Senator Martin Sandoval (D) convicted of bribery. (2020).

Local 
 Alderman of Chicago City Council Patrick Daley Thompson (D) convicted of fraud. (2022)
 Alderman of Chicago City Council Ricardo Muñoz (D) convicted of fraud. (2021)
 Alderman of Chicago City Council Proco Joe Moreno (D) convicted of filing a false report. (2021)

Indiana 
 State Senator Brent Waltz (R) convicted of campaign violations. (2022)

Louisiana 
 State Senator Karen Carter Peterson (D) pleaded guilty to gambling with campaign funds. (2022)
 State Senator Wesley T. Bishop (D) pleaded guilty to making false statements. (2020)

Maryland 
 State Secretary of Information Technology Isabel Fitzgerald (D) convicted of bribery. (2022)
 State Delegate Cheryl Glenn (D) pleaded guilty to accepting $33,000 in bribes. (2020).
 State Delegate Tawanna P. Gaines (D) pleaded guilty to misuse of campaign funds (2020)

Local 
 Mayor of Baltimore Catherine Pugh (D) convicted of fraud and perjury. (2020)

Massachusetts 
 State Representative David Nangle (D) convicted of wire fraud. (2020)

Michigan 
 State Representative Jewell Jones (D) convicted of driving under the influence of alcohol. (2022)
 State Representative Bryan Posthumus (R) was sentenced to 15 days in jail for "operating while intoxicated". (2021)

Local 
 Flint Township Clerk Kathy Funk (D) convicted of misconduct (ballot tampering). (2023)
 Detroit City Councillor Andre Spivey (D) convicted of bribery. (2022)
 Detroit City Councillor Gabe Leland (D) convicted of misconduct. (2021)

Missouri 
 State Representative Tricia Derges (R) convicted of fraud. (2022).
 State Representative Courtney Allen Curtis (D) convicted of fraud. (2020)

Local 
 Alderman of St. Louis John Collins-Muhammad (D) convicted of bribery. (2022)

New Hampshire 
 State Senator Jeff Woodburn (D) convicted of domestic violence and criminal mischief. (2021)
 State Representative Robert Forsythe (R) pleaded guilty to two counts of assault. (2021)

New York 
 State Assemblyman Luis Diaz (D) convicted of corruption. (2022)

Local 
 County Executive of Orange County Edward A. Diana (R) convicted of  corruption. (2021)
 New York City Councilor Chaim Deutsch (D) convicted of fraud. (2021)

North Carolina 
 State Representative David R. Lewis (R) convicted of making false statements to a bank. (2020)
Chair of the North Carolina Republican Party Robin Hayes, was convicted of lying to the FBI (2019).

Ohio

Local 
 Cincinnati City Councilor P.G. Sittenfeld (D) convicted of corruption. (2022)
 Cleveland City Councilor Kenneth Johnson (D) convicted of tax violations and federal conspiracy to defraud the government. Johnson's aide, Garnell Jamison, was convicted of 11 charges as well. (2021)

Oregon 
 State Representative Mike Nearman (R) pleaded guilty to official misconduct for allowing rioters to enter the Oregon State Capitol through a locked door. (2021)

Pennsylvania 
 State Representative Margo L. Davidson (D) convicted of theft. (2021)
 State Senator Mike Folmer (R) was convicted of possession of child pornography and served one year in prison. (2020)

Puerto Rico

Local 
 Mayor of Guayama Eduardo Cintrón Suárez (PPD) pleaded guilty to corruption for his part in a bribery scheme. (2022)

Tennessee 
 State Senator Brian Kelsey (R) pleaded guilty to conspiracy to defraud the Federal Election Commission, and aiding and abetting the acceptance of excessive contributions on behalf of a federal campaign. (2022)
 State Representative Robin Smith (R) pleaded guilty to fraud. (2022)
 State Senator Katrina Robinson (D) convicted of fraud. (2021)

Wisconsin 

 State Senator Kevin Shibilski (D) convicted of fraud. (2022)

West Virginia 

 State Delegate Derrick Evans (R) convicted of civil disobedience due to participating in the 2021 United States Capitol attack. (2022)

2010–2019

Alabama 
 State Senator Zeb Little (D) convicted of theft of client funds. (2019)
 State Representative Ed Henry (R) convicted of fraud. (2019)
 State Representative Micky Hammon (R) was convicted of fraud (2017)
 State Representative Oliver Robinson (D) was convicted of bribery. (2017)
 Governor of Alabama Robert J. Bentley (R) resigned after pleading guilty to two misdemeanor charges: failing to file a major contribution report, in violation of Code of Alabama § 17-5-8.1(c); and knowingly converting campaign contributions to personal use, in violation of Code of Alabama § 36-25-6." (2017)
 Speaker of the Alabama House of Representatives Mike Hubbard (R) was convicted on 12 of 23 felony charges. (2016)
 State Representative Greg Wren (R) pleaded guilty to an ethics violation. He resigned from the Alabama Legislature as a condition of his plea deal and was given a 12-month suspended sentence and ordered to pay $24,000. (2014)
 State Representative Terry Spicer (D) pleaded guilty to accepting more than $3,000 per month in bribes. (2011)

Arizona 
 State Senator Frank Antenori (R) convicted of trespassing. (2016)
 State Representative Ceci Velasquez (D) was convicted of theft. (2016)
 State Representative Richard Miranda (D) pleaded guilty to wire fraud and tax evasion. (2012)
 State Representative Ben Arredondo (D) was charged with bribery, fraud and extortion. He was sentenced to 18 months of house arrest. (2012)
 State Senator Scott Bundgaard (R) agreed to participate in domestic violence classes for six months after assaulting his girlfriend. (2011)

Local 
 Sheriff of Maricopa County Joe Arpaio (R) was convicted of contempt of court. He was pardoned by President Donald Trump before his sentencing. (2017)

Arkansas 
 State Senator Jeremy Hutchinson (R) convicted of bribery. (2019)
 State Representative Hank Wilkins (D) convicted of bribery. (2018)
 State Senator Jake Files (R) was convicted of fraud. (2018)
 State Representative Jon Woods (R) convicted of bribery. (2018)
 State Representative Eddie Cooper (D) convicted of embezzlement. (2018)
 State Representative Micah Neal (R) was convicted of bribery. (2017)
 State Representative Steven B. Jones (D) convicted of bribery. (2015)
 State Senator Paul Bookout (D) pleaded guilty to mail fraud. (2014)
 State Treasurer Martha Shoffner (D) convicted on the charges of extortion and bribery and sentenced to 30 months. (2014)
 State Representative Hudson Hallum (D) pleaded guilty to voter bribing. (2012)

California 
 State Senator Roy Ashburn (R) pleaded no contest to driving under the influence and was sentenced to two days in prison. (2010)
 State Senator Ron Calderon (D), brother of Tom, was convicted of money laundering. (2016)
 State Assemblyman Tom Calderon (D), brother of Ron, was convicted of money laundering. (2016)
 State Senator Leland Yee (D) pleaded guilty to one count of racketeering (2015) and was sentenced to five years in prison. (2016)
 State Senator Roderick Wright (D) was convicted of eight counts of perjury and voter fraud. He was sentenced to 90 days and barred him from ever holding public office again and will be required to perform 1,500 hours of community service and three years' probation under the terms of his conviction. (2014) Wright was pardoned in 2018.
 State Assemblywoman Mary Hayashi (D) was charged with felony grand theft after being caught on video surveillance allegedly shoplifting $2,445 worth of merchandise from San Francisco's Neiman Marcus store. She was sentenced to $180 fine and three years' probation and was ordered to stay more than 50 feet from the store. (2011)

Local 
 District Attorney for Contra Costa County Mark Peterson (D) convicted of perjury. (2017)
 Los Angeles County Sheriff of Los Angeles Lee Baca (D) convicted of obstructing the FBI. (2017)
 Mayor of Gardena Paul Tanaka (R) convicted of civil rights abuses. (2016)
 Sheriff of San Francisco Ross Mirkarimi (D) convicted of false imprisonment. (2013)
 Mayor of San Diego Bob Filner (D) given three months of house arrest, three years' probation, and partial loss of his mayoral pension after pleading guilty to state charges of false imprisonment and battery. (2013)

Colorado 
 State Representative Timothy J. Leonard (R) was found guilty of Contempt of Court and sentenced to 14 days in jail. (2016)
 State Senator Steve King (R) pleaded guilty to embezzlement of public property and misdemeanor first-degree official misconduct. Sentenced to serve two years' probation and complete 80 hours of useful public service. (2015)
 State Representative Douglas Bruce (R), was convicted on four counts of felony criminal activity including, money laundering, attempted improper influence of a public official, and tax fraud. He was sentenced on February 13, 2012, to a total of 180 days in jail, $49,000 in fines, and six months of probation which included extensive disclosure requirements. (2011)
 Secretary of State Scott Gessler (R) was found guilty of violating Colorado's ethics laws by using state money to attend a Republican event in Florida (2012)

Connecticut 
 State Representative Victor Cuevas (D) convicted of bank fraud. (2016)
 State Senator Ernie Newton (D) was sentenced to six months in prison for three counts of illegal practices in campaign financing. Newton had also been sentenced to four years for federal charges of accepting a $5,000 bribe, evading taxes and pilfering campaign contributions to pay for personal expenses. (2015)
 State Representative Christina Ayala (D) convicted of election fraud. (2014)
 State Senator Thomas Gaffey (D) convicted of larceny. (2011)

Local 
 Mayor of Hartford, Connecticut Eddie Perez (D), was sentenced to eight years, suspended after three years, with three years in prison, to be followed by three years of probation for corruption. (2010)

Florida 
 State Representative Daisy Baez (D) convicted of perjury. (2017)
 State Representative Erik Fresen (R) convicted of tax evasion. (2017)
 State Representative Dwayne L. Taylor (D) convicted of fraud. (2017)
 State Representative Reggie Fullwood (D) convicted of fraud. (2016)
 State Senator M. Mandy Dawson (D) convicted of fraud. (2011)

Local 
 Tallahassee Mayor Scott Maddox (D) convicted of corruption. (2019)

Georgia 
 State Representative Tyrone Brooks (D) convicted of tax fraud. (2015)

Hawaii 
 State Senator Rod Tam (D) convicted of theft. (2011)

Idaho 
 State Senator John McGee (R) pleaded guilty to probation violation and a disturbing the peace charge related to sexual harassment that had occurred at the Idaho State Capital Building and was jailed for 44 days. (2012) He had previously been arrested for grand theft auto and driving under the influence. McGee pleaded guilty to DUI and was sentenced to 180 days, serving 5 in jail, plus community service, 175 days' probation, plus fines and restitution. (2011)

Illinois 
 State Representative Keith Farnham (D) convicted of distributing child pornography. (2014)
 State Representative Derrick Smith (D) was arrested and convicted of accepting a $7,000 bribe. (2014)
 State Representative Constance A. Howard (D) convicted of mail fraud. (2013)
 State Representative La Shawn Ford (D) convicted of fraud. (2012)
 State Representative Ron Stephens (R) was found guilty of repeated drug abuse and DUI (2010)

Local 
 Alderman of Chicago Willie Cochran (D) convicted of fraud. (2019)
 chief executive officer of Chicago Public Schools Barbara Byrd-Bennett (D) convicted of bribery. (2015)
 Alderman of Chicago William Beavers (D) convicted of tax fraud. (2013)
 Alderman of Chicago Sandi Jackson (D) pleaded guilty to one count of filing false tax returns. (2013)
 Comptroller and Treasurer of Dixon, Rita Crundwell (D) was sentenced to 19 years and 7 months in prison for fraud, having embezzled $53 million. (2013)
 Alderman of Chicago Isaac Carothers (D) convicted of corruption. (2010)

Indiana 
 Secretary of State Charlie White (R) was convicted on 6 of 7 felony charges including perjury, theft and voter fraud. (2012)

Local 
 Mayor of East Chicago George Pabey (D) was convicted by a federal court jury on September 24, 2010, of conspiracy and theft of government funds. (2010)

Iowa 
 State Senator Kent Sorenson (R) pleaded guilty to one count of falsely reporting expenditures and one count of obstruction of justice. (2013)

Kansas 
 State Representative Trent K. LeDoux (R) pleaded guilty to one count of bank fraud. He was sentenced to 18 months in federal prison for defrauding Farmers and Merchants Bank of Colby, Kan., of more than $460,000. (2014)

Kentucky 
 State Representative Keith Hall (D) was convicted of bribery and sentenced to seven years in prison. (2016)
 State Representative Ben Waide (R) convicted of campaign violations. (2016)
 Commissioner of Agriculture Richie Farmer (R) was convicted of corruption and sentenced to 27 months in prison. (2014)

Louisiana 
 State Representative Girod Jackson, III (D) convicted of tax evasion. (2013)

Local 
 Mayor of New Orleans Ray Nagin (D) was found guilty on 20 counts of bribery and was sentenced to ten years in federal prison. (2014)
 Mayor of Mandeville Eddie Price III (R) was sentenced to 60 months on charges of income tax evasion and corruption. (2010)

Maine 
 State Representative David R. Burns (R) pleaded guilty to misdemeanor forgery and theft charges and was sentenced to six months. (2012)
 State Representative Frederick Wintle (R), pleaded guilty to a concealed weapons charge (2011)

Maryland 
 State Delegate Cheryl Glenn (D) convicted of fraud. (2019)
 State Senator Nathaniel T. Oaks (D) was convicted of corruption and sentenced to  years. (2018)
 State Delegate Michael L. Vaughn (D) was convicted of bribery. (2017)
 State Delegate Will Campos (D) was convicted of bribery. (2015)
 State Delegate Tiffany T. Alston (D) was convicted of embezzlement. (2013)
 State Delegate Don H. Dwyer Jr. (R) was operating a motorboat when it collided with another vessel injuring five others. Dwyer pleaded guilty, but appealed his 30-day jail sentence. The sentence was ultimately upheld after another incident in which Dwyer was stopped and arrested for a DUI and received an additional 30-day sentence, for a total of 60 days. (2012)

Local 
 Police Commissioner of Baltimore Darryl De Sousa (D) convicted of tax crimes. (2019)
 Anne Arundel County Executive John R. Leopold (R) convicted of misconduct in office. (2013)
 Prince George's County Executive Jack B. Johnson (D) pleaded guilty to extortion and, witness and evidence tampering. He was sentenced to seven years and three months in Butner federal prison in North Carolina. He was also fined $100,000. (2011)
 Prince George's County Councillor Leslie Johnson (D), was sentenced to one year and one day in prison for political corruption. (2011)
 Mayor of Baltimore Sheila Dixon (D) was convicted of fraudulent misappropriation and was sentenced to four years of probation. (2010)

Massachusetts 
 State Representative Carlos Henriquez (D) was convicted of two counts assault and battery charges and sentenced to 2½ years, with six months to be served in the Middlesex County House of Correction and Jail in Billerica, Massachusetts and the remaining two years to be spent on probation. (2014)
 State Representative Stephen Stat Smith (D) pleaded guilty to two misdemeanor counts of deprivation of rights under color of law for his role in a voter fraud scheme. (2012)
 Speaker of the House Salvatore DiMasi (D) was found guilty of using his position to secure multimillion-dollar state contracts for Cognos, a business intelligence software company, in exchange for kickbacks. (2011)
 State Senator Anthony D. Galluccio (D) was given one year in prison after failing a sobriety test and violating his probation from a previous hit and run accident. (2010)

Local 
 Boston Councillor Chuck Turner (G) was expelled from the Boston City Council on December 1, 2010, following his conviction on federal bribery charges. (2010)

Michigan 
 State Senator Bert Johnson (D) was convicted of fraud. (2018)
 State Representative Brian Banks (D) was convicted of fraud for filing false financial statements (2017)
 State Senator Virgil Smith, Jr. (D) was convicted of assault and was sentenced to 10 months in jail, five years of probation and not be allowed to hold public office. (2015)
 Justice of the Michigan Supreme Court Diane Hathaway (D) was sentenced to 366 days in prison for criminal mortgage fraud. (2013)

Local 
 Detroit City Councillor Charles Pugh (D) was sentenced to 5 1/2 to 15 years for sex with a teenage boy under the age of 16. (2016)
 Flint City Councilman Eric Mays was sentenced to 28 days in jail for impaired driving. (2016)
 Ingham County Prosecutor Stuart Dunnings III (D) convicted of misconduct. (2016)
 Mayor of Detroit Kwame Kilpatrick (D) was sentenced to 18 months to 5 years in prison for violating his probation in 2010. In 2013 he was sentenced to 28 years in prison for federal charges including racketeering and extortion. (2013)
 Detroit City Councillor Monica Conyers (D) pleaded guilty to conspiring to commit bribery and served just over 27 months at the Alderson Federal Prison Camp in West Virginia. (2010)

Mississippi 
 State Senator Chris Massey (R) was arrested for aggravated assault with a shovel for an argument with two maintenance workers. He was found guilty and given six months' probation. (2016)
 State Representative Greg Davis (R) was indicted on state charges of embezzlement, false pretense and making fraudulent statements. He was convicted and sentenced to serve 2½ years in state prison. (2012)
 Judge Bobby DeLaughter (D) pleaded guilty of one count of lying to the FBI and was sentenced to 18 months in prison. (2010)

Missouri 
 State Representative Steve Webb (D) convicted of theft. (2013)
 Governor of Missouri Roger B. Wilson (D) was fined $2,000 by the Missouri Ethics Commission. In July he was sentenced to two years of probation on the money laundering charge. (2012)
 State Representative Ray Salva (D) convicted of fraud. (2011)
 State Representative Talibdin El-Amin (D) convicted of bribery. (2010)
 Speaker of the Missouri House of Representatives Rod Jetton (R) was arrested for "recklessly causing serious physical injury" to an unnamed woman during sadomasochistic sex and pleaded guilty to misdemeanor assault. He was sentenced to probation and fined. (2010)

Local
 County Executive of St. Louis County Steve Stenger (D) convicted of bribery. (2019)
 County Executive of Jackson County, Missouri Mike Sanders (D) convicted of fraud. (2018)

Montana 
 State Senator Jason Priest (R) pleaded guilty to two counts of assault and resisting arrest. (2014)
 State Representative Tony Belcourt (D) was convicted of four federal corruption charges involving projects on the Rocky Boy Indian Reservation. He was sentenced to 7½ years in prison. (2014)
 State Representative Joel Boniek (R) was found guilty of "quid pro quo corruption" in taking $9,060 in contributions from the Western Tradition Partnership. (2010)
 State Representative Mike Miller (R) admitted to accepting "unlawful corporate contributions" from Western Tradition Partnership, was found guilty, was fined $4K and agreed not run for public office for four years. (2010)
 State Senator Scott Sales (R) from Bozeman, was accused of accepting unlawful contributions from Western Traditions Partnership. He pled guilty, was fined and forced to "express regret" in settling the accusations. (2010)
 State Senator Art Wittich (R) was found guilty of campaign violations by coordinating with and taking illegal corporate contributions from, the Western Tradition Partnership. (2014)

Nevada 
 State Senator Kelvin Atkinson (D) convicted of fraud. (2019)
 State Assemblyman Steven Brooks (D) convicted of making threats to kill. (2013)

New Jersey 
 Deputy Executive Director of the Port Authority of New York and New Jersey Bill Baroni (R) convicted over the Fort Lee lane closure controversy (2016)
 State Assemblyman Alberto Coutinho (D) convicted of theft and falsifying records. (2013)
 State Assemblyman Bob Schroeder (R) pled guilty to misconduct and theft (2012)
 State Assemblyman Neil M. Cohen (D) jailed for child pornography. (2010)
 State Assemblyman Anthony Chiappone (D) jailed for filing false campaign finance reports. (2010)

Local 
 Mayor of Atlantic City Frank Gilliam (D) was convicted of wire fraud (2019)
 Mayor of Trenton Tony F. Mack (D) was indicted for bribery, fraud, extortion and money laundering on February 7, 2014, he was convicted on all counts. (2014) He was sentenced to nearly five years in prison.
 Mayor of Hamilton John Bencivengo (R) was sentenced to 38 months in prison for corruption (2013)
 Mayor of Perth Amboy Joseph Vas (D) and his longtime top mayoral aide, Melvin Ramos, were indicted by a federal grand jury for mail fraud, misapplication of funds, and making false statements to the Federal Election Commission. sentenced to six-and-a-half years for federal corruption. (2011)

New Hampshire 
 State Representative Thomas Katsiantonis (D) convicted of tax evasion. (2018)
 State Representative Kyle Tasker (R) was charged with three drug offenses and one count of using a computer to lure a teen. The teen was actually a police officer working undercover. He was sentenced to 3–10 years. (2016)
 State Representative Albert 'Max' Abramson (R) was found guilty of one felony count of reckless conduct for shooting a firearm. He received a suspended jail sentence and was ordered to pay a fine and complete community service. (2012)
 State Representative Gary Wheaton (R) was arrested for a second offense of speeding and driving on a suspended license. He pled guilty to recklessly endangerment. (2011)
 State Representative James E. Ryan (D) stole checks from contributors that were intended for the committee to Elect House Democrats. He pled guilty to felony charges of theft, forgery and issuing bad checks. (2009)

New Mexico 
 State Senator Phil Griego (D) was convicted of corruption. (2017)
 Secretary of State Dianna Duran (R) was convicted of fraud. (2015)

New York 
 State Senator George D. Maziarz (R) pleaded guilty to a misdemeanor for offering a false instrument for filing to avoid five felony counts and a trial for filing false campaign expenditure reports. (2018)
 State Senator Marc Panepinto (D) convicted of sexual harassment. (2018)
 State Assemblywoman Pamela Harris (D) pleaded guilty to two counts of wire fraud, one count of making false statements to the Federal Emergency Management Agency, and one count of witness tampering. Sentenced to $10,000 restitution, six months in jail followed by three years of supervised release, 400 hours of community service, and restitution of $70,400. (2018)
 Majority Leader of the New York State Senate Dean Skelos (R) convicted of federal corruption. (2018)
 Minority Leader of the State Senate John L. Sampson (D) was convicted of obstructing justice and making false statement. (2015)
 Speaker of the New York State Assembly Sheldon Silver (D) was convicted on federal corruption charges. (2015)
 Majority Leader of the State Senate Malcolm Smith (D) was found guilty in federal court of conspiracy, wire fraud, bribery and extortion for trying to bribe a Republican Party official to let him onto the Republican ballot in the 2013 New York City mayoral race. (2014)
 State Assemblywoman Gabriela Rosa (D) sentenced to a year in jail for entering into a sham marriage to gain U.S. citizenship. (2014)
 State Assemblyman William Boyland, Jr. (D) convicted of bribery (2014)
 State Assemblyman Eric Stevenson (D) found guilty of bribery, conspiracy and other related charges. (2014)
 State Assemblyman Nelson Castro (D) convicted of perjury (2013)
 State Senator Shirley Huntley (D) convicted of mail fraud. She was sentenced to one year and a day in prison. (2013)
 Majority Leader of the State Senate Pedro Espada Jr. (D) On May 14, 2012, a federal jury found Espada guilty of embezzling money from federally funded healthcare clinics, after 11 days of deliberation he was sentenced to five years in prison. (2012)
 State Senator Vincent Leibell (R) found guilty of felony bribery, tax evasion, and obstruction of justice charges related to $43,000 in cash kickbacks he took from 2003 to 2006. (2012)
 State Senator Nicholas Spano (R), Spano pleaded guilty to a single count of tax evasion. He was sentenced to 12 to 18 months in federal prison. (2012)
 New York State Comptroller Alan Hevesi (D), was convicted on charges surrounding a "pay to play" scheme regarding the New York State Pension Fund, and was sentenced to 1–4 years. (2011)
 State Senator Carl Kruger (D) resigned his seat and pleaded guilty to charges of corruption and bribery. (2011)
 State Senator Efrain Gonzalez Jr. (D) was convicted of fraud and embezzling $400,000 from the West Bronx Neighborhood Association Inc. and was sentenced to seven years in federal prison (2010)

Local 
 County Executive of Nassau County Ed Mangano (R) convicted of bribery and fraud. (2019)
 New York City Council member Ruben Wills (D) convicted of fraud. (2017)
 New York City Council member Dan Halloran (R) convicted of taking bribes and orchestrating payoffs. (2014)
 New York City Council member Larry Seabrook (D) On February 9, 2010, a federal grand jury indicted Seabrook on 13 counts of money laundering, extortion, and fraud. Seabrook was convicted on nine charges. (2012)
 President of the New York City Council Andrew Stein (D) was convicted of tax evasion regarding a Ponzi scheme. (2010)

North Carolina 
 State Representative Rodney W. Moore (D) pleaded guilty to making false statements (2019)
 State Senator Fletcher L. Hartsell, Jr. (R) convicted of fraud for misusing campaign contributions and falsely labeling them as expenses. Sentenced to eight months. (2016)
 State Representative Deb McManus (D) resigned her State House seat and pleaded guilty to a tax charge. (2013)
 State Representative Stephen LaRoque (R) convicted on 12 counts including theft, money laundering and filing false tax returns. (2013)
 Governor Mike Easley (D) was convicted of a federal campaign law felony. (2010)

Local 
 Mayor of Charlotte Patrick Cannon (D) charged with accepting bribes. (2014)
 Mayor of High Point Bernita Sims (D) convicted of a worthless check charge. (2014)

Ohio 
 State Representative Ron Gerberry (D) found guilty of charge of unlawful compensation of a public official. (2015)
 State Representative Steve Kraus (R) convicted of a fifth-degree felony. (2015)
 State Representative Peter Beck (R) convicted of perjury. (2015)
 State Representative Dale Mallory (D) found guilty to a first-degree misdemeanor count of filing a false disclosure form and a fourth-degree misdemeanor charge of improper gratuities and was sentenced to a total of $600 in fines and a year of probation. (2014)
 State Representative Sandra Williams (D) convicted of filing a false report. (2014)
 State Representative Clayton Luckie (D) convicted of corruption. (2013)
 State Representative W. Carlton Weddington (D) was convicted on bribery charges and sentenced to three years in prison. (2012)

Local 
 Cuyahoga County Common Pleas Judge Lance Mason (D) convicted of domestic abuse and assault. He was sentenced to two years in prison. (2015)

Oklahoma 
 State Senator Ralph Shortey (R) convicted of child sex trafficking. (2018)
 State Representative Gus Blackwell (R) was accused of perjury and embezzlement for using both state funds and campaign funds to pay for the same trips. In a plea bargain he pled guilty and agreed to pay restitution. (2017)
 State Senator Bryce Marlatt (R) convicted of sexual battery and was sentenced to 90 days' probation, fined $500, plus court costs. (2017)
 State Senator Kyle Loveless (R) was sentenced to three years of probation and restitution after pleading guilty to embezzling campaign funds. (2017)
 State Representative Rick Brinkley (R) was convicted of fraud. (2015)
 State Senator Debbe Leftwich (D) was found guilty of bribery in connection with the 2010 Oklahoma political corruption investigation. (2013)
 State Representative Randy Terrill (R) was found guilty of bribery in connection with the 2010 Oklahoma political corruption investigation. Terrill was sentenced to one year in prison. (2013)
 President pro tempore of the Oklahoma Senate Mike Morgan (D) was found guilty of accepting $12,000 in bribes (2012)

Pennsylvania 
 State Representative Movita Johnson-Harrell (D) convicted of felony theft. (2019)
 State Representative Vanessa L. Brown (D) convicted of bribery. (2018)
 Treasurer of Pennsylvania Barbara Hafer (D) convicted of lying to the FBI. (2017)
 State Representative Marc Gergely (D) convicted of conspiracy. (2017)
 State Representative Leslie Acosta (D) convicted of embezzlement. (2016)
 Attorney General of Pennsylvania Kathleen Kane (D) was convicted of perjury. (2016)
 State Representative Louise Bishop (D) was convicted of corruption. (2016)
 State Representative Michelle Brownlee (D) was convicted of a conflict of interest. (2015)
 State Representative Harold James (D) was convicted of corruption. (2015)
 State Representative Ronald Waters (D) was convicted of bribery. (2015)
 Treasurer of Pennsylvania Rob McCord (D) pleaded guilty to two counts of extortion. (2015)
 State Senator LeAnna Washington (D) was convicted of conflict of interest. (2014)
 Turnpike Commission CEO Joe Brimmeier (D) pleaded guilty to felony conflict of interest charges. (2014)
 Turnpike Commission chief operating officer George Hatalowich (D) pleaded guilty to felony conflict of interest charges. (2014)
 Turnpike Commission chairman Mitchell Rubin (D) was sentenced to 24 months of probation for his plea to commercial bribery. (2014)
 State Representative Jose Miranda (D) was convicted of fraud. (2013)
 Pennsylvania Supreme Court Justice Joan Orie Melvin (R) was convicted in February 2013, on six of seven corruption charges including theft of services, criminal conspiracy, and misappropriation of state property. (2013)
 State Senator and Republican Majority Whip Jane Orie (R) was convicted in March 2012, of 14 counts of forgery, conflict of interest and theft of services, which included five felonies. (2012)
 State Senator and Democratic Minority Floor Leader of the Pennsylvania Senate Bob Mellow (D) pleaded guilty to using Senate staffers for campaigns. (2012)
 State Representative Joseph F. Brennan (D) announced that he was withdrawing his reelection bid after allegations that he assaulted his wife and then drove drunk from the scene of the incident. He was later convicted on both the DUI and assault charges. (2012)
 Secretary of Revenue of Pennsylvania Stephen Stetler (D) convicted of using state resources. (2012)
 State Representative John M. Perzel (R), pleaded guilty to eight criminal charges, including two counts of conflict of interest, two counts of theft, and four counts of conspiracy, concerning a scheme to spend millions of taxpayer dollars on computer technology from Aristotle, Inc. for the benefit of Republican political campaigns. (2011)
 State Representative Brett Feese (R) sentenced to 4 to 12 years in state prison, an additional 2 years of probation, a $25,000 fine, and $1 million in restitution for his role in the Computergate state government corruption scandal. (2011)

Local 
 Sheriff of Philadelphia John Green (D) convicted of bribery. (2019)
 Mayor of Allentown Ed Pawlowski (D) convicted of corruption. (2018)
 Mayor of Reading Vaughn Spencer (D) convicted of corruption, bribery, wire fraud and conspiracy. (2018)
 Upland Borough City Councilman Edward M. Mitchell (R) convicted of bribery, conspiracy, theft by deception, and restricted activities. (2018)
 Assistant City solicitor, Allentown Dale Wiles convicted of conspiracy to commit mail and wire fraud. (2018)
 District Attorney of Philadelphia R. Seth Williams (D) convicted of bribery. (2017)
 Mayor of Harrisburg Steven R. Reed (D) pleaded guilty to theft of public funds. (2017)
 Tax collector, York County Melissa Ann Arnold convicted of theft of public funds. (2015)
 Tax collector, Delaware County, Robert Henry Park (R) pleaded guilty to theft. (2014)
 Tax collector, Berks County, Jodie Mae Keller pleaded guilty to two counts of theft. (2013)
 Mayor of Chester, John H. Nacrelli convicted on federal bribery and racketeering charges. (1979)

Rhode Island 
 State Senator James Doyle II (D) from the 8th district, was being investigated for a check kiting scheme to defraud three local banks of more than $74 million. He was charged and pled guilty to 31 counts of bank fraud and tax evasion. (2018)
 State Representative John Carnevale (D) convicted of perjury. (2018)
 State Representative Raymond Gallison (D) was convicted of fraud. (2017)
 State Representative Gordon Fox (D) and Speaker of the House, pleaded guilty to wire fraud, bribery and filing a false tax return. Fox used $108,000 from his campaign account for personal expenses, accepted a $52,000 bribe to push for the issuance of a liquor license for a Providence restaurant in his role as a member of the Board of Licenses, and failed to declare these illegal sources income on his tax returns. (2015)
 State Representative Joseph Almeida (D) was given a $1,000 fine and a year on probation for mis-using funds. (2015)
 State Senator Patrick McDonald (D) convicted of embezzlement. (2014)
 State Representative John McCauley Jr (D) convicted of tax evasion. (2013)
 State Representative Leo Medina (D) convicted of stealing life insurance. (2013)
 State Senator Christopher Maselli (D) convicted of bank fraud. (2010)

South Carolina 
 State Senator John E. Courson (R) was convicted of misconduct and illegal use of campaign funds. Courson had paid Richard Quinn & Associates $247,829 of campaign money over six years and got back $132,802 for personal use. (2017)
 State Representative James "Jim" Harrison (R) convicted of corruption. (2018)
 State Representative Rick Quinn (R) convicted of corruption. (2018)
 State Representative Jim Merrill (R) convicted of corruption. (2017)
 State Representative Chris Corley (R) pled guilty to first-degree domestic violence for beating his wife and threatening to kill her with a gun. (2017)
 Speaker of the South Carolina House of Representatives Bobby Harrell (R) pleaded guilty to illegally using campaign funds for his own use. He was sentenced to a one-year prison term. (2014)
 State Representative Nelson Hardwick (R) pled guilty to assault and battery in the third degree for sexual harassment of a female employee. He was ordered to resign and fined. (2015)
 State Representative Thad Viers (R) convicted of money laundering, sentenced to three years in federal prison. (2015) Previously arrested in 2012 on charges of harassing a 28-year-old woman described as an ex-girlfriend. He subsequently withdrew his bid for GOP nomination to the US Congress from South Carolina's 7th congressional district, citing "personal reasons". He was sentenced in 2014 to 60 days in jail for second-degree harassment.
 State Secretary of the Department of Transportation, Robert St. Onge (R) arrested and convicted of having twice the legal limit of alcohol in his system. He was forced to resign due to the state's no tolerance laws. (2014)
 Lieutenant Governor of South Carolina Ken Ard (R) resigned his position and pleaded guilty to seven counts of misuse of campaign funds. He was sentenced to five years' probation, fined $5,000 and required to work 300 hours of community service. (2011)
 State Representative Kris Crawford (R) from Florence County, was charged with seven counts of willfully failing to pay taxes and found guilty. (2010)

Tennessee 
 State Representative Joe E. Armstrong (D) convicted of falsifying tax returns. (2016)
 State Representative Curry Todd (R) from Collierville, pled guilty to possessing a loaded gun while DUI. He was sentenced to 48 hours in jail, one year of probation, fined, given community service, alcohol training, alcohol car locking device and ordered to participate in MADD. (2011)

Local 
 Mayor of Nashville Megan Barry (D) pleaded guilty to felony theft related to an affair she had with the police officer who ran her security detail. (2018)
 Sheriff of Rutherford County Robert F. Arnold (R) pleaded guilty to wire fraud, honest services fraud, and extortion in a scheme to distribute cigarettes to jailed prisoners. (2016)

Texas 
 State Representative Carlos Uresti (D) convicted of fraud and money laundering. (2017)
 State Representative Ron Reynolds (D) was convicted of battery and was sentenced to one year in jail. (2015)
 State Representative Joe Driver (R) pleaded guilty to using tens of thousands of taxpayer dollars to reimburse himself for travel expenses that his campaign had already funded. (2011)

Local 
 Mayor of Dallas Dwaine Caraway (D) convicted of corruption (2019)
 City Councillor of Dallas Carolyn Davis (D) was convicted of bribery. (2019)
 State District Judge Angus Kelly McGinty (R) was arrested because he solicited and accepted bribes in exchange for favorable rulings. He pleaded guilty to a charge of honest services fraud and was given a two-year prison sentence (2014)

Vermont 
 State Senator Norman McAllister (R) pleaded guilty to a violation of a prohibited act of prostitution. He was sentenced to a work crew for 25 days and served nine to twelve months on probation. (2015)

Virginia 
 State Delegate Ron Villanueva (R) was convicted of fraud and sentenced to two and a half years in federal prison. (2019)
 State Delegate Phil Hamilton (R) sentenced to 9½ years in prison for federal bribery and extortion. (2010)

Washington, D.C. 
 District of Columbia Councillor Michael Brown (D) was convicted of bribery and sentenced to 39 months. (2013)
 Chairman of the Council of the District of Columbia Kwame R. Brown (D) was convicted of bank fraud. (2012)
 District of Columbia Councillor Harry Thomas, Jr. (D) was convicted of felony counts of theft of government funds and falsifying tax returns. (2012)

Washington 
 Auditor of Washington Troy Kelley (D) was convicted of fraud. (2018)

Wisconsin 
 State Representative Bill Kramer (R) was sentenced to five months in jail, after pleading no contest to two charges of sexual assault with three years' probation. (2014)
 State Representative Jeff Wood, (R), has pleaded no contest to fifth-offense OWI charge which is a felony. He has been sentenced to spend nine months in jail, with three years' probation. (2011)

West Virginia 
 Justice of the Supreme Court of Appeals of West Virginia Allen Loughry (R) pleaded guilty to fraud. (2019)
 Justice of the Supreme Court of Appeals of West Virginia Menis Ketchum (D) pleaded guilty to wire fraud. (2018)

2000–2009

Alabama 
 State Representative Suzanne L. Schmitz (D) was found guilty on 7 out of 8 counts of federal fraud charges. (2009)
 State Senator Edward McClain (D) was convicted on 48 counts of money laundering, mail fraud, bribery and conspiracy. (2009)
 Governor of Alabama Don Siegelman (D) was found guilty of bribery, mail fraud and obstruction of justice on June 29, 2006, and sentenced to 88 months. (2006)

Local 
 Mayor of Birmingham Larry Langford (D) was sentenced on March 5, 2010, to 15 years in prison for conspiracy, bribery, fraud, money laundering, and filing false tax returns in connection with a long-running bribery scheme. (2010) He was also fined more than $119,000.

Alaska 
 Alaska political corruption probe in which VECO Corporation an oilfield service corporation, was investigated by the IRS, FBI and Department of Justice. Veco executives Bill Allen and VP Rick Smith pleaded guilty to federal charges of extortion, bribery, and conspiracy to impede the Internal Revenue Service. The charges involved bribing Alaska lawmakers who came to be known as the "Corrupt Bastards Club" to vote in favor of an oil tax law favored by VECO that was the subject of vigorous debate in 2006, and were part of a larger probe of political corruption in Alaska by federal authorities.
 State Representative Thomas Anderson (R), Found guilty of seven felony counts of extortion, bribery, conspiracy, and money laundering. Sentenced on October 15, 2007, to a term of 60 months in prison.
 State Representative Pete Kott (R), found guilty on three charges of bribery and sentenced to six years in prison and fined $10,000. (2007)
 State Representative Vic Kohring (R), convicted on November 1, 2007, of three counts of bribery by the Veco Corporation. In May 2008, he was sentenced to three-and-a-half years in prison.
 State Representative Bruce Weyhrauch (R), main charges dismissed by Supreme Court, given probation on state charges
 State Senator John Cowdery (R), pleaded guilty to lesser charges. (2009) Sentenced to six months' house arrest and a $25,000 fine.
 State Representative Beverly Masek (R), was sentenced to six months on September 23, 2009.

Arizona 
 Corporation Commissioner Jim Irvin (R) was found guilty of trying to influence a corporate bidding war and fined $60K. (2003)

California 
 State Senator Tom Berryhill (R) was found guilty of money laundering by Judge Jonathan Lew and the California Fair Practices Commission of deliberately trying to conceal, deceive or mislead the transfer of $40,000 to the Republican Central Committee of Stanislaus County and the Republican Central Committee of San Joaquin County, which then passed it to the campaign of Bill Berryhill, his brother, thus circumventing California's contribution limits of $3,600 per donation. (2008)

Local 
 Sheriff of Orange County Mike Carona (R) convicted of witness tampering. (2008)
 Member of the San Francisco Board of Supervisors Ed Jew (D), was sentenced to 64 months in federal prison for extortion, and a year in county jail for perjury. (2008)
 Member of San Diego City Council Ralph Inzunza (D) was convicted of corruption. (2005)

Connecticut 
 Governor of Connecticut John G. Rowland (R) was convicted of one-count of deprevation of honest services. (2004) He served ten months in a federal prison followed by four months' house arrest, ending in June 2006.
 State Treasurer of Connecticut Paul J. Silvester (R) was convicted of fraud. (2004)

Local 
 Mayor of Bridgeport Joseph Ganim (D), was convicted of leveraging his position to receive kickbacks from city contractors for more than $500,000 in cash, meals, clothing, wine and home renovations. (2003)
 Mayor of Waterbury Philip Giordano (R) While investigating municipal corruption, the FBI discovered phone records and pictures of Giordano with a prostitute, as well as with her 10-year-old niece and her eight-year-old daughter. He was arrested on July 26, 2001, and, in March 2003, was convicted of 14 counts of using an interstate device, his cellphone, to arrange sexual contact with children. He was also convicted of violating the girls' civil rights. He was sentenced to 37 years in prison.

Florida 
 State Representative Bob Allen (R) was convicted of soliciting a sex act from an undercover police officer. (2007)
 State Senator Alberto Gutman (R), was convicted of corruption in a Medicare fraud scheme. Gutman, his wife and 23 others were sentenced to five years in federal prison, three years' probation and fined $50,000. (2000)

Local 
 Sheriff of Broward County Ken Jenne (D) convicted of fraud. (2007)
 Mayor of Orlando Ernest Page (D) was convicted of bribery and official misconduct during a temporary stint as mayor. He was subsequently sentenced to 42 months in prison. (2006)

Georgia 
 State Senator Walter Ronnie Sailor Jr. (D) pled guilty to laundering money (2007)
 State Senator Charles Walker (D) convicted of charges including tax evasion, mail fraud and conspiracy (127 counts, in all). He was sentenced to 10 years. (2005)
 Schools Superintendent Linda Schrenko (R) sentenced to eight years in prison for embezzlement of federal education funds. (2004)
 State Representative Robin L. Williams (R) was convicted of campaign fraud. (2004)

Local
 Mayor of Atlanta Bill Campbell (D) convicted of tax evasion. (2006)

Hawaii 
 State Representative Galen Fox (R) was convicted of sexual misconduct when he improperly touched a woman flying next to him. (2006)
 State Representative Nathan Suzuki (D) was found guilty of tax fraud. (2004)
 State Senator Marshall Ige (D) convicted of corruption. (2002)

Illinois 
 Governor of Illinois Rod Blagojevich (D) was charged with conspiracy to commit mail, wire fraud and solicitation of bribery. He was impeached and removed from office by 59–0 votes of the Illinois Senate. On August 17, 2010, he was convicted on just one of 24 federal charges. In a retrial in 2011, he was found guilty on 17 other counts and sentenced to 14 years in prison. (2011)
 Governor of Illinois George H. Ryan (R) was convicted of 18 counts of corruption and sentenced to six years and six months. (2006)
 State Representative Patricia Bailey (D) was convicted of perjury and fraud. (2005)

Local 
 Alderman of Chicago Arenda Troutman (D) was convicted of bribery. (2005)
 Alderman of Chicago Edward Vrdolyak (D) was convicted of fraud. (2008)
 City Clerk of Chicago James Laski (D) was convicted of fraud. (2006)
 Mayor of Cicero, Betty Loren-Maltese (R) was convicted of an insurance fraud. She was sentenced to eight years in prison (2002)

Indiana 
 State Representative Dennie Oxley (D) convicted of impersonating a public servant. (2009)

Local 
 City Clerk of Gary Katie Hall (D) pleaded guilty to mail fraud. (2003)

Kansas 
 State Representative Phil Hermanson (R) while being investigated, Hermanson pled guilty to a charge of driving under the influence of prescription drugs. (2009)

Louisiana 
 State Senator Derrick Shepherd (D), sentenced to 37 months for corruption. (2008)
 Governor of Louisiana Edwin Edwards (D) convicted of extortion, mail fraud and money laundering. (2000)
 Insurance Commissioner James H. "Jim" Brown (D) convicted of lying to FBI investigators. (2000)

Massachusetts 
 State Senator J. James Marzilli, Jr. (D) pleaded guilty to all charges against him, including resisting arrest and disorderly conduct and was sentenced to three months in prison. (2008)
 State Senator Dianne Wilkerson (D) was video taped by the FBI stuffing bribe money into her bra. Wilkerson pleaded guilty to eight counts of attempted extortion. (2008)
 Speaker of the House Thomas Finneran (D) pleaded guilty to one count of obstruction of justice and received 18 months' probation. (2004)

Maryland 
 State Senator Thomas L. Bromwell (D) was sentenced to seven years in prison for racketeering, corruption and fraud to benefit construction company Poole and Kent. (2007)
 State Delegate Robert A. McKee (R) pleaded guilty to possession of child pornography and was sentenced to a 37-month term. (2006)

Michigan 
 State Representative Kevin Green (R) pleaded guilty to driving while impaired by alcohol. (2008)

Missouri 
 State Senator Jeff Smith (D) convicted of two counts of obstruction of justice. He was sentenced to one year and a day of prison and was fined $50,000. (2009)
 State Representative Nathan Cooper (R) convicted on two felony counts of immigration fraud. (2007)

Nebraska 
 State Treasurer Lorelee Byrd (R) pleaded guilty to one misdemeanor charge of misconduct. (2003)
 State Senator Ray Mossey (R) was found guilty and pled no contest to prescription drug charges and was sentenced to two years' probation. He was also sentenced to one year's probation for drunken driving when Mossey's blood-alcohol level tested at twice the legal limit. In addition, he was fined $14,000 for using campaign finance funds to pay an online dating service and a tattoo parlor. (2005)
 Regent David Hergert (R) of the University of Nebraska was arrested soon after his election for violating campaign finance laws. He pled guilty to false reporting and obstruction and was sentenced to five years' probation and fined $654,000 (2005)

Nevada 
 State Controller Kathy Augustine (R) was impeached and convicted of using state personnel and property for her re-election campaign, but not removed from office. She was fined $15,000. (2004)
 State Representative Brent Parker (R) pleaded guilty to soliciting sex from a male undercover police officer. He was ordered to attend a 10-week therapy class or face up to 180 days in jail. (2003)

Local 
 Operation G-Sting or Strippergate was an FBI probe into bribes taken by County Commissioners in Clark County, Nevada and City Council members in San Diego, California. It was the result of strip club owners Rick Rizzolo and Mike Galardi trying to remove a "no touch" law affecting the girls in their clubs. The investigation resulted in the convictions of 17 defendants including:
 Clark County Commissioner Lynette Boggs McDonald (R) pled no contest to filing a false statement and campaign funding irregularities (2009)
 Clark County Commissioner Mary Kincaid-Chauncey (D) was sentenced to 30 months in federal prison, fined $7,600 and ordered to forfeit $19,000 in assets (2006)
 Clark County Commissioner Dario Herrera (D) was sentenced to 50 months in federal prison, fined $15,000 and ordered to forfeit $60,000 in assets (2006)
 Clark County Commissioner Erin Kenny (D) was sentenced to 2½ years in prison (2006)
 Clark County Commissioner Lance Matthew Malone (R) pleaded guilty to violating federal racketeering laws for bribing commissioners(2006)

New Jersey 
 New Jersey Operation Bid Rig: An FBI sting operation indicted 44 New Jersey officials and several Rabbis, mainly for bribery, counterfeiting of intellectual property, money laundering, organ harvesting, and political corruption. Arrested were:
 Assemblyman Daniel M. Van Pelt (R) Resigned after indictment for bribery.
 State Senator Wayne R. Bryant (D) was convicted of bribery. (2007)
 State Senator Joseph Coniglio (D) indicted for abusing state grants, mail fraud and extortion. (2008)
 State Senator Sharpe James (D) On April 16, 2008, James was convicted of five counts of fraud by a federal jury. On July 29, 2008, he was sentenced by Judge William J. Martini to 27 months in prison.
 State Senator John A. Lynch, Jr. (D) convicted of mail fraud and tax evasion. (2006)
 Assemblyman Anthony Impreveduto (D) convicted of corruption. (2004)

Local 
 New Jersey Operation Bid Rig:
 Mayor of Hoboken Peter Cammarano (D) was convicted of corruption. (2009)
 Mayor of Secaucus Dennis Elwell (D) was convicted of corruption. (2009)
 Commissioner and Chairwoman of the Jersey City Housing Authority Lori Serrano (D) was convicted of corruption. (2009)
 Mayor of Passaic Samuel Rivera (D) convicted of bribery. (2008) Rivera was sentenced to 21 months in prison.
 County Executive of Hudson County Robert C. Janiszewski (D) was convicted of bribery. (2005)
 Chief Executive of Essex County James W. Treffinger (R) was convicted of corruption and fraud and ordered to pay $30,000 in restitution and serve 13 months in jail. (2003)
 Mayor of Camden Milton Milan (D) was convicted of corruption. (2000)
 Mayor of Marlboro Matthew Scannapieco (R) pled guilty to tax evasion and corruption involving $245K in bribes paid by a real estate developer (2005)

New Mexico 
 State Treasurer Robert Virgil (D) was found guilty of corruption and sentenced to 37 months in prison and fined $97,000. (2007)
 State Treasurer Michael Montoya (D) was found guilty of corruption and sentenced to 40 months in prison and a $40,000 fine. (2007)

New York 
 State Health Commissioner Antonia Novello (R) pled guilty to misuse of staff by spending $48,000 of public money making them carry out her personal chores, such as taking her shopping and picking up her dry cleaning. She was convicted and ordered to perform 250 hours of community service, pay $22,500 in restitution plus a $5,000 fine. (2009)
 State Senator Kevin Parker (D) was charged with felony assaulting and menacing and two misdemeanor counts of criminal mischief for attacking a New York Post photographer. He was found guilty and served three years' probation for the misdemeanors but was acquitted of the felony charge. (2009)
 State Assemblyman Anthony Seminerio (D) pleaded guilty to taking large sums of money from hospitals through a consulting firm while still a member of the New York State Assembly. His appeal was never heard but his conviction was abated due to death. (2009)
 Supreme Court Justice Thomas J. Spargo (R), was convicted by a federal jury of attempted extortion and attempted soliciting of a bribe for pressuring a lawyer to give $10,000 to his defense fund. (2009)
 State Senator Efrain Gonzalez (D) was sentenced to 84 months (7 years) in prison, followed by two years' supervised release, following pleading guilty to two conspiracy counts and two wire fraud counts. (2009)
 State Assemblyman Brian McLaughlin (D) was arrested in 2008 and sentenced to ten years in prison for racketeering. (2009)
 State Senator Hiram Monserrate (D), convicted of one count of misdemeanor assault, and acquitted of two counts of felony assault and one other count of misdemeanor assault. (2009)
 State Senator Diane Gordon (D) was convicted of receiving bribes. (2008)
 State Assemblyman Chris Ortloff (R) while serving on the State Parole Board, pleaded guilty to a felony charge of online enticement of minors. He was sentenced to 150 months in federal prison (2008)
 Supreme Court Justice Gerald Garson (D) was sentenced to 3.5 to 10 years in prison for accepting expensive gifts in exchange for fixing divorce cases. (2005)
 State Assemblyman Clarence Norman Jr. (D) was sentenced to nine years in jail for falsifying records. (2005)
 State Assemblywoman Gloria Davis (D) was sentenced to 90 days in jail and five years' probation for bribery. (2003)
 State Senator Guy Velella (R) was indicted for bribery and conspiracy for accepting at least $137,000 in exchange for steering public-works contracts to the paying parties. He ultimately pleaded guilty to one count and received a year in jail. He served 182 days. (2002)

Local 
 New York City Councillor Miguel Martinez (D) pleaded guilty to three counts of conspiracy two days later. He admitted to stealing $106,000 that was for children's art programs and low-income housing. He was convicted on three felonies, and was sentenced to five years in prison. (2009)
 NY City Councilman Dennis P. Gallagher (R) resigned from office and pleaded guilty to sexually abusing a woman in his district office while he was intoxicated. (2007)

North Carolina 
 State Representative James B. Black (D) pleaded guilty to a federal charge of public corruption and was sentenced to five years in prison. (2007)
 State Representative Paul Miller (D), was sentenced to a year's probation and fined $1,000 for fraud. (2006)
 Commissioner of Agriculture Meg Scott Phipps (D) pleaded guilty to campaign finance charges and served three years in prison. (2003)
 State Representative Michael P. Decker (R) pleaded guilty to one count of conspiracy to commit extortion, honest services mail fraud, and money laundering. Decker, a Republican, solicited Democrats and agreed to accept $50,000 and other gifts in return for switching parties. (2002)
 State Representative Thomas Wright (R), was found guilty of three counts of felony fraud. He was sentenced to 6 to 8 years(2007)

Local 
 Cabarrus County Commissioner Coy C. Privette, (R) pled guilty to aiding and abetting prostitution. (2007)

Northern Marianas Islands 
 Lieutenant Governor of the Northern Mariana Islands Timothy Villagomez (CP) was sentenced to 87 months in federal prison for misuse of government funds. (2009)
 Northern Marianas Islands Commerce Secretary James A. Santos (R) was sentenced to 87 months in prison for misuse of government funds. (2009)

Oklahoma 
 State Auditor and Inspector Jeff McMahan (D) convicted of accepting bribes. (2008)
 Insurance Commissioner Carroll Fisher (D) convicted for corruption and sentenced to 14 months. (2006)
 State Senator Gene Stipe (D) pleaded guilty to federal charges of perjury, conspiracy to obstruct a Federal Election Commission investigation, and conspiracy to violate the Federal Election Campaign Act. (2003)

Ohio 
 Governor of Ohio Bob Taft (R) pleads no contest and is convicted on four misdemeanor ethics violations. He was fined $4,000 and ordered to apologize to the people of Ohio. (2005)

Oregon 
 State Representative Dan Doyle (R) resigned from office and was sentenced to 15 months in jail for finance violations. (2005)
 State Senator John Mabrey (R) was convicted of insurance fraud. (2002)

Pennsylvania 
 State Senator Vince Fumo (D) was found guilty of 139 counts of mail fraud, wire fraud, conspiracy, obstruction of justice and filing a false tax return. Two staffers were also arrested and indicted on charges of destroying electronic evidence, including e-mail related to the investigation. (2009)
 Secretary of Revenue of Pennsylvania Stephen Stetler (D) sentenced to 1½–5 years in prison, fined $35,000, order to pay $466,621 restitution for multiple corruption convictions. (2009)
 State Representative Milton Street (D) convicted of tax evasion and was sentenced to serve 30 months in prison. (2008) Street appealed, but his conviction was affirmed by the Third Circuit Court of Appeals.
 State Representative Linda Bebko-Jones (D) and her chief-of-staff were charged with forging some of the signatures on their nominating petitions. They were both sentenced to 12 months' probation and fined $1,500 with community service. (2007)
 State Representative & Democratic Whip of the Pennsylvania House of Representatives Mike Veon (D), convicted of misusing state funds and sentenced to 6–14 years in jail. (2007)
 State Representative and Democratic Leader of the Pennsylvania House of Representatives Bill DeWeese (D) found guilty of five of the six felony counts with which he was charged and sentenced to 30–60 months. (2007)
 State Representative Jeffrey Habay (R) was convicted of 21 counts of harassment, solicitation for perjury and intimidation. (2007)
 State Representative Frank LaGrotta (D) pleaded guilty to two counts of corruption for giving away $26,000 of state funds in the 2006 Pennsylvania General Assembly bonus controversy. Sentenced to six months' house arrest, probation, and fines. (2007)
 State Representative Thomas W. Druce (R) was convicted in 2000 of a 1999 hit and run that killed a man. (2000)
 State Representative R. Tracy Seyfert (R) pleaded guilty to Theft of Federal Property by acquiring a $160,000-dollar, 10 ton generator for her own use if the power grid had failed on the Millennium. She was sentenced to five years in federal prison and assessed a $5,000 fine. (2001)
 State Senator Bill Slocum (R) pleaded guilty to six criminal misdemeanor charges for filing false reports to the Pennsylvania Department of Environmental Protection and discharging 3.5 million gallons of raw sewage into Brokenstraw Creek while he was a sewage plant manager in Youngsville, Pennsylvania. (2000)
 State Representative Frank Gigliotti (D) was convicted and sentenced in 2000 to 46 months' incarceration for extortion, mail fraud, and filing a false income tax return. (2000)
 State Representative Jeffrey Habay (R) was found guilty on December 12, 2005, of conflict of interest. he resigned and was sentenced to 6 to 12 months of prison followed by four years of probation.
 State Senator F. Joseph Loeper (R) pleaded guilty in federal court of falsifying tax-related documents to conceal more than $330,000 in income he received from a private consulting firm while serving in the Senate. He resigned his senate seat on December 31, 2000, and was later released from federal prison at Fort Dix, New Jersey, after serving six months. (2000)

Local 
 President Judge of the Luzerne County Court of Common Pleas Mark Ciavarella (D) sentenced to 28 years in federal prison for his involvement in the kids for cash scandal. (2009)
 Senior Judge Michael Conahan (D) sentenced to 17½ years in federal prison for his involvement in the Kids for cash scandal. (2009)
 Wrightsville Borough Councillor Fred Smeltzer (R) pleaded no contest to rape and was sentenced to six months in prison. (2005)

Puerto Rico 
 Speaker of the House Edison Misla Aldarondo (R) was convicted of extortion, money laundering and witness tampering and sentenced to 71 months in prison. See sex scandals. (2007)
 Jose Omar Cruz-Mercado was the Associate Secretary of the Puerto Rico Department of Education when he aided an extortion and kickback scheme that involved fraudulent payments of more than $4.3 million in cash and property from PRDE contractors.
 Deputy Secretary of State Angel Ocasio Ramos received 18 months in prison for making illegal payments to Rangel in exchange for government contracts.
 Puerto Rico Senator Freddy Valentin, Puerto Rican was sentenced to 33 months in prison for money laundering and extortion in a corruption case involving public-housing contracts in the U.S. territory, a former pro-statehood senator, pleaded guilty in March to the two charges. (2002)

Rhode Island 
 State Representative and House Majority Leader Gerard M. Martineau (D) was given 37 months in prison for influence peddling in Operation Dollar Bill. (2008)
 State Senator John A. Celona (D) was found guilty of accepting $320,000 in bribes from the Roger Williams Medical Center and Blue Cross & Blue Shield of Rhode Island. He was sentenced to 30 months in prison. (2007)
 State Representative Thomas W. Pearlman (R) was charged with fee-gouging and providing incompetent counsel. He was found guilty of misconduct, suspended and ordered to pay restitution. (2004)

Local 
 Mayor of Providence Buddy Cianci (R). His first administration ended in 1984 when he pleaded guilty to assault. His second stint as mayor ended when he was forced to resign following his conviction for racketeering conspiracy named Operation Plunder Dome served four years in federal prison.

South Carolina 
 State Treasurer Thomas Ravenel (R) convicted on cocaine charges. (2007)
 State Senator Charles Tyrone "Ty" Courtney (R) was convicted of bank fraud, mail fraud and making false statements on a loan application. (2000)
 Agriculture Commissioner Charles Sharpe (R) was found guilty of charges of extortion, money laundering and lying to federal investigators, stemming from an illegal cockfighting ring. He served two years in prison. (2004)

South Dakota 
 State Representative Ted Klaudt (R) was found guilty on all four counts of second-degree rape as well as witness tampering. He was sentenced to 54 years in prison. (2008)

Tennessee 
 Operation Tennessee Waltz: an FBI sting operation between 2003 and 2007 in which a number of state and local representatives were arrested including;
 State Senator John Ford (D) Sentenced to 66 months for bribery.
 State Senator Kathryn Bowers (D) pleaded guilty to one count of bribery.
 State Senator Ward Crutchfield (D) pleaded guilty to one count of bribery.
 State Senator Roscoe Dixon (D) pleaded guilty to bribery
 State Representative J. Chris Newton (R) pleaded guilty to bribery.
 State Representative Ronald 'Ronnie' Davis (R) pled guilty to four felony charges of conspiring to sell fake passports and to supplying drugs to his girlfriend (2002)

Local 
 Tax Assessor of Putnam County Byron Looper (R), was convicted of the murder of State Senator Tommy Burks (D). (2000)
 Juvenile Court Judge, Darrell Catron (R) was found guilty of corruption and sentenced to 18 months' probation. (2007)

Utah 
 State Representative Brent Parker (R) pleaded guilty to soliciting sex from a male undercover police officer. (2003)
 Judge of the 3rd State District Ray M. Harding Jr. (R) was found guilty of possession of cocaine and heroin and sentenced to 120 days in jail, 2 years' probation, community service and fined. (2002)

Virginia 
 State Secretary of Finance John Forbes (R) was sentenced to 10 years in prison after he admitted embezzling $4 million in tobacco-region economic development money. He was sentenced to 120 months in prison (2009)
 State Delegate Fenton Bland (D) pleaded guilty to one count of conspiracy to commit bank fraud; sentenced to 57 months in prison and ordered to pay $1.2 million in restitution (2005)
 State Republican Party Director Edmund Matricardi III (R) pled guilty to one count of interception of a wire communication by illegally eavesdropping on a protected Democratic phone call. During sentencing Matricardi was forced to resign, spend three years on probation and fined $10,000. (2003)

West Virginia 
 State Representative Lisa D. Smith (R) pleaded guilty to one count of mail fraud and one count of mail fraud. She was sentenced to two years in prison, three years of probation and fined $1,000,000.

Wisconsin 
 State Assemblyman Scott Jensen (R) convicted of misuse of public workers. (2006)
 State Assemblyman Steven Foti (R) convicted of ethics violations. (2006)
 State Senator Gary George (D) was convicted of fraud. (2004)
 State Assemblywoman Bonnie Ladwig (R) convicted of ethics violations. (2004)
 State Senator Brian Burke (D) was sentenced to six months in county jail for misconduct in office and obstructing an officer for using state workers for his campaign. (2003)
 State Senator Charles Chvala (D) sentenced to serve nine months in prison for campaign violations including coordination violations. (2002)

Local 
 Member of the Milwaukee Common Council Michael McGee, Jr. (D) was convicted of corruption. (2008)

1990–1999

Alabama 
 Governor of Alabama H. Guy Hunt (R) was convicted of improperly using campaign money and was sentenced to five years' probation and fined $211,000. (1993)

Alaska 
 State Senator George Jacko (D) was found guilty of sexual harassment of a 17-year-old page (1993)

Arizona 
 State Representative Sue Laybe (D) was found guilty of bribery and given six months during the AZSCAM investigation (1990)
 State Representative Donald Kenney (R), was convicted in the AZSCAM investigation for taking a bribe of $55,000 in a gym bag and was sentenced to five years in prison. (1990)
 State Representative James Hartdegen (R), pleaded guilty to violating three campaign laws and was forced to resign as part of the AZSCAM investigation. (1990)
 State Representative James Meredith (R), was found guilty of making false campaign contributions during the AZSCAM investigation (1990)
 State Representative Bobby Raymond (D), investigated in the AZSCAM investigation, stated his favorite line was, "What's in it for me?" Found guilty of conspiracy and bribery and sentenced to two years in prison, with seven years of probation (1990)
 State Senator Jesus "Chuy" Higuera (D), guilty of taking a $4,000 bribe and demanding a shrimp and fax concession in all future casinos. Sentenced to two months in prison and four years' probation (1990)

Arkansas 
 Governor of Arkansas Jim Guy Tucker. (D) As part of the Whitewater investigation run by Kenneth Starr, Tucker was convicted of fraud and conspiracy and sentenced to four years' probation. (1996)
 Secretary of State Bill McCuen (D) pleaded guilty to bribery, kickbacks, tax evasion and trading in public office. He was sentenced to 17 years in prison and fined (1996)
 State Senator Carolyn Walker (D) was convicted of accepting payoffs for pledging to support gambling legislation as part of the AZSCAM Investigation. Sentenced to four years in prison (1991)

California 
 State Representative Brian Setencich (R) was convicted of tax evasion connected to his 1996 re-election campaign. (2000)
 The FBI's Bribery and Special Interest sting operation (BRISPEC, or "Shrimpscam") targeted corruption in the California legislature. Five convictions were obtained.
 State Senator Alan Robbins (D) resigned on November 21, 1991, in advance of pleading guilty to federal racketeering charges in connection with insurance-industry bribes.
 State Senator Joseph Montoya (D) was convicted in April 1990 of rackeetering, extortion and money laundering and was sentenced to 6½ years in prison.
 State Senator Frank Hill (R) and his aid were found guilty of corruption and money laundering and sentenced to 46 months in prison. (1994)
 California Board of Equalization member Paul B. Carpenter (D) was found guilty of 11 counts of obstruction of justice and money laundering. (1993)
 State Assemblyman Pat Nolan (R) served 29 months for bribery in the FBI's BRISPEC sting operation.

Local 
 Treasurer-Tax Collector of Orange County, California Robert Citron (D) convicted of fraud. (1995)

Connecticut 
 State Treasurer Paul J. Silvester (R) was sentenced to 21 months in prison for racketeering and money laundering. (1999)

Local 
 Mayor of Waterbury Joseph J. Santopietro (R) was found guilty of taking a $25,000 payoff in return for $1 million in city pension funds. (1991)

Florida
 Speaker of the Florida House of Representatives Bolley Johnson (D) was convicted of tax evasion. (1999)
 State Representative Marvin Couch (R) was arrested in Orlando for soliciting sex and pled guilty to unnatural or lascivious acts and exposure of his sexual organs. (1996)

Local 
 Mayor of Miami Beach Alex Daoud (D) convicted of bribery. (1991)

Georgia 
 State Senator Ralph David Abernathy III (D) convicted of fraud. (1997)

Guam 
 Governor of Guam Ricardo Bordallo (D) was convicted on ten counts of corruption and was sentenced to nine years in prison and fined more than $100,000, but committed suicide the day before he was scheduled to begin serving his prison sentence (1990)

Illinois 
 State Senator Bruce A. Farley (D) sentenced to 18 months in prison for mail fraud (1999)
 State Senator John A. D'Arco, Jr. (D) served about three years in prison for bribery and extortion (1995)
 State Representative James DeLeo (D) caught in the "Operation Greylord" investigation of corruption in Cook County. He was indicted by a federal grand jury for taking bribes and negotiated guilty plea on a misdemeanor tax offense, and was placed on probation (1992)
 State Representative Joe Kotlarz (D) convicted and sentenced to jail for theft and conspiracy for pocketing in about $200,000 for a sale of state land to a company he once served as legal counsel (1997)
 State Treasurer Jerome Cosentino (D) was convicted of bank fraud and sentenced to nine months' home confinement. (1991)

Local
 Mayor of Markham, Illinois, Roger Agpawa (D) was convicted of mail fraud (1999)
 Alderman of Chicago Percy Giles (D) convicted of bribery. (1999)
 Alderman of Chicago Virgil Jones (D) convicted of bribery. (1998)
 Alderman of Chicago Lawrence Bloom (D) convicted of fraud. (1998)
 Alderman of Chicago John Madryzk (D) convicted of fraud. (1998)
 Alderman of Chicago Jesse Evans (D) convicted of racketeering. (1997)
 Alderman of Chicago Joseph Martinez (D) convicted of fraud. (1997)
 Alderman of Chicago Alan Streeter (D) convicted of bribery. (1996)
 Alderman of Chicago Ambrosio Medrano (D) convicted of bribery. (1996)
 Alderman of Chicago Fred Roti (D) convicted of bribery. (1996)
 Mayor of Chicago Heights Charles Panici (R) guilty of racketeering, bribery and extortion. Sentenced to 10 years. (1992)

Hawaii 
 State Representative Daniel J. Kihano (D) was sentenced to one year for one count of mail fraud. (1992)

Kentucky 
 FBI Operation Boptrot was an investigation into bribery and the horse racing industry. Approximately 10% of Kentucky's legislature, both the house and senate, was implicated in this scandal, some taking bribes for as little as $100. (1992) Legislators convicted as a result of Operation Boptrot included:
 House Speaker Don Blandford (D) pleaded guilty after 1992 indictment on charges of extortion, racketeering and lying. He was sentenced to 64 months in prison and was fined $10,000.
 State Representative Jerry Bronger (D) was indicted in 1992 and later pleaded guilty to charges that he accepted $2,000 in exchange for blocking legislation that would hurt harness race tracks. He was sentenced to 10 months in prison.
 State Representative Clay Crupper (D) pleaded guilty after 1992 indictment and was fined $10,000 on charges of interstate travel in aide of racketeering.
 State Senator Helen Garrett (D) was charged in 1992 with taking a $2,000 bribe from a track in exchange for helping pass legislation. She pleaded guilty and received four years' probation.
 State Senator John Hall (D) pleaded guilty to conspiracy and other charges stemming from 1992 indictment in Operation BopTrot.
 State Representative Ronny Layman (R) was indicted in 1992 on charges of conspiracy to commit extortion and making false statements to the FBI. He pleaded guilty and was sentenced to three months of home detention and community service.
 State Senator David LeMaster (D) was indicted in 1993, and acquitted of extortion and racketeering, but convicted of lying. He was sentenced to a year in prison and fined $30,000, but served just one day after resigning from the legislature.
 State Representative Bill McBee (D) was sentenced to a 15-month prison term for his role in Operation BopTrot.
 State Senator Virgil Pearman (D) pleaded guilty after 1993 indictment charging that he took an illegal $3,000 campaign contribution. He was sentenced to three months in a halfway house, probation and was fined $5,000.
 State Senator John Rogers (R), then the Minority Leader in the Kentucky Senate, was sentenced in 1994 to 42 months in prison after conviction on charges of extortion, conspiracy, attempted extortion, mail fraud and lying to the FBI.
 State Senator Art Schmidt (R) pleaded guilty to a 1993 indictment for withholding the fact that he took a $20 cash payment from another senator tied to Operation BopTrot. He was sentenced to probation and fined $2,500.
 State Senator Landon Sexton (R) pleaded guilty after 1994 indictment charging that he took an illegal $5,000 cash campaign contribution. He was sentenced to 15 consecutive weekends in jail, home detention for two months and probation for two years. In addition he was fined $5,000.
 State Representative Bill Strong (D) pleaded guilty after 1993 indictment charges that he took an illegal $3,000 campaign contribution and did not deposit the money into his campaign fund. He was sentenced to three months in a halfway house, probation and was fined $3,000.
 State Representative Richard Turner (R) pleaded guilty to a 1993 charge that he filed a false campaign finance report. Charges that he took an illegal $3,000 cash campaign contribution were dropped.
 State Senator Patti Weaver (D) pleaded guilty after 1993 indictment charging that she was promised help finding a job in exchange for support of legislation. She was sentenced to weekend incarceration, probation and community service and was fined $10,000.

Louisiana 
 State Senator Melvin Irvin (D) convicted of bribery. (1991)
 Insurance Commissioner Doug Green (D) convicted of fraud and money laundering. (1991)

Massachusetts 
 State Representative Charles Flaherty (D) pleaded guilty to felony tax evasion for submitting false receipts regarding his business expenses and to violations of the state conflict of interests law. (1996)

Local 
 Middlesex County Sheriff John P. McGonigle (D) was convicted of tax evasion and pleaded guilty to conspiracy to commit racketeering for demanding kickbacks from two of his deputies. (1994)
 Essex County Sheriff Charles Reardon (D) pleaded guilty to taking kickbacks from process servers. (1996)

Minnesota 
 State Representative Robert Johnson (R) was convicted of three drunk driving arrests in a seven-week period. He was sentenced to a year in prison. (1995)
 State Representative Randy Staten (DFL) pled guilty to writing bad checks and was given a suspended sentence of 90 days, then probation. (1986)
 State Senator Harold Finn (DFL) was found guilty of stealing $1KK from the Leech Lake Band of Chippewa. Sentenced to five years. (1995)

Missouri 
 Secretary of State Judith Moriarty (D) was impeached for misconduct involving back-dating of her son's election paperwork to hide a missed filing deadline, and convicted by the state supreme court.
 Speaker of the Missouri House of Representatives Bob F. Griffin (D), Griffin pleaded guilty on the second day of the second trial, to two counts of bribery and mail fraud in conjunction with the original highway scheme. He was sentenced to 48 months in prison, a $7,500 fine, and a $100 special penalty assessment. (1995)
 Missouri Attorney General William L. Webster (R) pleaded guilty to embezzlement charges and was sentenced to two years in prison. (1993)

Nebraska 
 State Treasurer Frank Marsh (R) was convicted of misdemeanor charges for making personal, long-distance telephone calls. (1991)

New York 
 Chief Judge of the New York Court of Appeals Sol Wachtler (R), was investigated for extortion and harassment. He pleaded guilty to one charge of threatening to kidnap a teenage girl and served 15 months. (1993)
 State Senator Andrew Jenkins (D) was convicted of illegal banking, sentenced to one year and one day. (1990)

North Carolina 
 Lieutenant Governor of North Carolina James C. Green (D), was convicted of income tax fraud and was sentenced to 33 months of house arrest. (1997)

Ohio 
 State Senator Jeff Johnson (D), was convicted of three counts of extortion. (1990)

Oklahoma 
 Governor of Oklahoma David Lee Walters (D) pleaded guilty to a misdemeanor election law violation. (1993)

Pennsylvania 
 State Representative Frank Serafini (R), was convicted of perjury (1999)
 Supreme Court Justice Rolf Larsen (D) convicted of conspiracy. (1992)
 Attorney General Ernie Preate (R) pleaded guilty to mail fraud. (1995)
 State Senator William G. Stinson (D) was found guilty of voter fraud and his election was reversed. (1994)
 State Senator William Lee Slocum, Jr. (R) pleaded guilty to federal charges of violating the Clean Water Act between 1983 and 1995, when he operated the Youngsville Sewage Treatment Plant and allowed repeated pollution discharges of raw sewage. Sentenced to one month in jail, five months of home detention, and fined $15,000.
 State Senator Dan S. Delp (R), pleaded guilty to buying a 19-year-old prostitute liquor and food using state money (1998)

Rhode Island 
 Governor of Rhode Island Edward Daniel DiPrete (R) pleaded guilty to bribery and racketeering charges and served one year in prison. (1998)

South Carolina 
 State Representative Paul Wayne Derrick (R) was convicted of accepting $1,000 in cash for his support of a gambling proposal being investigated in the FBI Operation, Lost Trust. (1991)
 State Representative Rick Lee (R) pleaded guilty to violating the Hobbs Act during the FBI Operation, Lost Trust. (1990)
 State Representative Daniel E. Winstead (R) from Charleston, pled guilty to accepting bribes. (1990)
 State Senator Robert Albert Kohn (R) State Senator from Charleston, pleaded guilty to conspiracy and bribery, and served seven months in prison.

Texas 
 Attorney General of Texas Dan Morales (D) pleaded guilty to mail fraud and tax evasion in relation to a $17 million tobacco industry settlement with the State of Texas in 1998. He was sentenced to four years in a federal prison for mail fraud and tax evasion in a case involving Texas' $17 billion settlement with the tobacco industry in 1998. He was released in 2007.
 State Senator Drew Nixon (R) was arrested on a charge of soliciting sex from an undercover Austin police officer which led to another charge of carrying an unlicensed, loaded gun for which he did not have a proper permit. The jury recommended probation on the prostitution charge, but jail time on the weapons charge. He was sentenced to six months in prison and fined $6,000. (1997)

Vermont 
 Lieutenant Governor of Vermont Brian D. Burns (D), was convicted of three counts of fraud for having claimed to be working full-time for a public policy association while he also claimed to be attending Harvard University full-time. He appealed but his conviction was affirmed. (1995)

Virginia 
 State Senator Robert E. Russell Sr. (R) was convicted of embezzling $6,750 from a nonprofit cycling club. (1995)

West Virginia 
 Governor of West Virginia Arch A. Moore Jr (R) guilty of mail fraud, tax fraud, extortion and obstruction of justice. (1990)

District of Columbia 
 Mayor of the District of Columbia Marion Barry (D) caught on videotape using drugs in an FBI sting (1990)

1980–1989

Alaska 
 State Senator Paul Fischer (R), pled guilty to misuse of state funds and taking illegal campaign contributions from an oil-field construction company. (1989)
 State Senator George Hohman (D) State Senator, bribed to obtain a water-bomber aircraft for the state. Sentenced to 3 years and fined $30,000. (1982)

Arizona 
 Governor of Arizona Evan Mecham (R) was found guilty of obstruction of justice and misuse of government funds. (1988)

Arkansas 
 State Representative Preston Bynum (R) convicted of bribery. (1980)

California 
 Chief Administrative Officer of San Francisco Roger Boas (D) convicted of rape. (1988)

Florida 
 State Representative Don Gaffney (D) convicted of extortion. (1989)

Hawaii 
 State Representative Clifford Uwaine (D) convicted of conspiracy. (1982)

Illinois 
 Governor of Illinois Dan Walker (D) was convicted of improprieties stemming from loans from a Savings and Loan. He served 18 months in prison. (1987)
 State Senator Edward Nedza (D) convicted of fraud. (1987)
 Attorney General of Illinois William J. Scott (R) was convicted of tax fraud and sentenced to a year in prison. (1980)

Local 
 Alderman of Chicago Marian Humes (D) convicted of bribery. (1989)
 Alderman of Chicago Perry Hutchinson (D) convicted of bribery. (1988)
 Alderman of Chicago Chester Kuta (D) convicted of bribery. (1987)
 Alderman of Chicago Wallace David Jr (D) convicted of bribery. (1987)
 Alderman of Chicago Clifford Kelley (D) convicted of corruption. (1987)
 Alderman of Chicago Louis Farina (D) convicted of extortion. (1983)
 Alderman of Chicago Tyrone Kenner (D) convicted of bribery. (1983)
 Alderman of Chicago William Carothers (D) convicted of extortion. (1983)
 Alderman of Chicago Stanley Zydlo (D) convicted of extortion. (1980)

Louisiana 
 President of the Louisiana State Senate Michael Hanley O'Keefe, Sr. (D) jailed for mail fraud. (1983) In February 1983, he was convicted of mail fraud and two counts of obstruction of justice.
 State Agriculture Commissioner Gil Dozier (D) was convicted of extortion and racketeering and jury tampering. (1982)
 State Senator Gaston Gerald (D) convicted of bribery. (1981)

Maine 
 State Representative Donald F. Sproul (R) was sentenced to 10 days in prison for ballot tampering.

Massachusetts 
 Transportation Secretary Barry Locke (D) was convicted of conspiring to take payoffs as part of a kickback scheme at the MBTA. (1982)

Michigan 
 State Senator Jerry C. Diggs (D) accepting bribes to kill taxes on race track revenue; He was tried, convicted, and sentenced (1983)

Nebraska 
 Attorney General Paul L. Douglas (R) was convicted of perjury and resigned. (1984)
 State Senator James Pappas (R) from North Platte was charged with circulating a petition in a county in which he was not qualified and lying about it. He was found guilty, fined and placed on probation for two years. (1986)

New Hampshire 
 State Representative Vincent Palumbo (R) pled guilty to bank fraud and tax evasion. He was sentenced to more than a year (1989)

New Jersey

Local 
 Mayor of Newark Kenneth A. Gibson (D) was convicted of bribery and for stealing funds from a school construction. (1986)

New York 
 State Senator Richard E. Schermerhorn (R) was convicted of income-tax evasion, obstruction of justice and filing a false statement. Sentenced to 18 months in prison. (1989)
 State Senator William C. Brennan (D) convicted of bribery. (1984)
 State Senator Joseph R. Pisani (R) was convicted of multiple counts of fraud and tax evasion, most of which were overturned on appeal. The Appeals Court upheld one conviction for taking money from an escrow account from his client. (1983) In 1986, Pisani pleaded guilty to other charges of tax evasion, and was sentenced to one year in prison.

Oregon 
 State Senator Bill Olson (R) pleaded guilty to second-degree sex abuse with a 13-year-old female. (1988)

Pennsylvania 
 Pennsylvania Auditor General Al Benedict (D) convicted of racketeering. (1988)
 State Treasurer R. Budd Dwyer (R) was convicted of bribery. (1987)

Local 
 President of the Philadelphia City Council George X. Schwartz (D) was convicted of taking bribes. (1985)
 Member of the Philadelphia City Council Harry Jannotti (D) was convicted of taking bribes. (1985)
 Member of the Philadelphia City Council Louis Johanson (D) was convicted of taking bribes. (1985)

Tennessee 
 FBI investigation Operation Rocky Top concerned the illegal sale of charity bingo licenses which resulted in over 50 convictions. Two targets of the investigation committed suicide: Tennessee Secretary of State Gentry Crowell (D) (in December 1989, just before he was scheduled to testify for a third time before a federal grand jury) and long-time State Representative Ted Ray Miller (D) (after being charged with bribery). (1986)
 Governor of Tennessee Ray Blanton (D) convicted of wire fraud and sentenced to 22 months. (1982)
 State Representative Emmitt Ford (D) was convicted of fraud. (1981)
 State Representative Tommy Burnett (D) jailed for 10 months for tax evasion. (1983)
 State Representative Robert J. Fisher (R), was convicted of soliciting a $1,000 bribe from Carter County Sheriff George Papantoniou to kill a state bill the sheriff opposed. Fisher was given a $500 fine and a 30-day suspended sentence and was expelled from the State Senate by a vote of 92–1 (1980)

Texas 
 State Representative Mike Martin (R) from Longview, hired his cousin to shoot him as a publicity stunt. He pleaded guilty to perjury and paid a $2,000 fine on the condition that he also resign. (1982)

Vermont

Local
 Assistant Judge Jane Wheel of Chittenden County was convicted of three counts of falsifying court records so she could claim pay for days she had not actually worked. She was sentenced to one to three years in prison on each count, with all but 45 days suspended, plus 1,500 hours of community service. (1987) Wheel's investigation was part of a larger investigation into possible corruption among members of the Vermont Supreme Court. (1988) (See also Vermont vs Hunt (1982).)

Washington 
 State Senator Gordon Walgren (D) convicted of violating the Travel Act during the investigation called GAMSCAM. (1980)
 State Representative John A. Bagnariol (D) was convicted of racketeering charges during the investigation called GAMSCAM. (1980

Wisconsin 
 State Senator Richard Shoemaker (D) convicted of receiving illegal money. (1988)
 State Assemblyman Walter L. Ward, Jr. (D) convicted of sexual assault. (1980)

West Virginia 
 State Senator Dan R. Tonkovich (D) pleaded guilty to extorting $5,000 from gambling interests. He was sentenced to five years in prison. (1989)
 State Senate Larry Tucker (D) extorted $10,000 from a lobbyist, resigned and pleaded guilty. (1989)

1970–1979

Alabama 
 State Treasurer Melba Till Allen (D) was convicted of using her office to obtain bank loans to build a theme park and of failing to make full disclosure of her personal finances. She was sentenced to six years in jail and three-and-a-half years of probation. (1978)

Arkansas 
 State Senator Guy H. Jones (D) convicted of tax evasion in 1973, he was expelled from the senate in 1974.

Illinois 
 State Representative Walter C. McAvoy (R) convicted of taking a bribe. (1978)
 The Illinois concrete industry was investigated for bribery and six politicians were found guilty. (1976)
 State Rep. Pete Pappas (R), the chief conspirator who turned government informant and pleaded guilty; got probation.
 State Rep. Louis F, Capuzi (R) – (Chicago) guilty
 State Rep, Robert Craig (D), guilty, 3-year sentence, $5,000 fine.
 State Sen. Kenneth W. Course (D), guilty, 3-year sentence, $5,000 fine.
 State Rep. Frank P. (Pat) North (R), guilty, 3-year sentence, $5,000 fine.
 State Sen. Jack E. Walker (R), guilty, 3-year sentence, $5,000 fine.
 State Sen. Donald D. Carpentier (R), guilty, 3-year sentence, $5,000 fine.
 State Representative John Wall (R) was convicted of conspiracy to extort money from employees of Crown Personnel, Inc., connected with the labor department's program to find jobs for Vietnam veterans through private employment agencies. (1971)
 Governor Otto Kerner, Jr. (D) After serving two terms, Kerner was appointed to the Seventh District Court when he was convicted on 17 counts of bribery, conspiracy, perjury and related charges. He was sentenced to three years in federal prison. (1973)
 Secretary of State Edward Barrett (D) was convicted of bribery, mail fraud, and income tax evasion. (1973)

Local 
 Alderman of Chicago Edward Scholl (D) convicted of bribery. (1975)
 Alderman of Chicago Donald Swinarski (D) convicted of bribery. (1975)
 Alderman of Chicago Paul Wigoda (D) convicted of bribery. (1974)
 Alderman of Chicago Thomas Keane (D) convicted of fraud. (1974)
 Alderman of Chicago Frank Kuta (D) convicted of bribery. (1974)
 Alderman of Chicago Joseph Potempa (D) convicted of bribery. (1973)
 Alderman of Chicago Casimir Staszcuk (D) convicted of bribery. (1973)
 Alderman of Chicago Joseph Jambrone (D) convicted of bribery. (1973)
 Alderman of Chicago Fred Hubbard (D) convicted of embezzlement. (1972)

Louisiana 
 Attorney General Jack P. F. Gremillion (D) was sentenced to three years in prison for perjury for covering up his dealings with a failed savings and loan. (1972)

Maryland 
 State Representative George Santoni (D) was convicted of extortion and served 43 months in prison. (1977)
 Governor Marvin Mandel (D) was convicted of mail fraud and racketeering. (1977) He served nineteen months of his sentence in a federal prison before being pardoned by President Ronald Reagan. On November 12, 1987, Judge Frederic N. Smalkin overturned Mandel's conviction.
 Anne Arundel County Executive Joseph Alton Jr. (R) pleaded guilty to charges of conspiracy to commit extortion. He served seven months of an eighteen-month sentence in Allenwood Federal Correctional Complex. (1974)

Massachusetts 
 State Senator George Rogers (D) was convicted of conspiracy to steal and bribe. He was sentenced to two years in prison and fined $5,000. (1978)
 State Senators Joseph DiCarlo (D) and Ronald MacKenzie (R) were convicted of violating the Hobbs Act, which forbids extortion by public officials, and the Travel Act, which forbids crossing state lines for the purpose of extortion. They were sentenced to one year in prison and fined $5,000. (1977)
 State Representative David J. O'Connor (D) was convicted of willful failure to file Federal income tax returns. He was sentenced five months in jail and fined $10,000. (1970)

Michigan
 State Representative Monte Geralds (D) was expelled from the State House of Representatives, after he was convicted of embezzling $24,000 from a client. (1978)

New Jersey 
 State Assemblyman Arnold D'Ambrosa (D) sentenced to nine months in jail after admitting to charges of embezzlement, bribery, perjury and official misconduct. (1976)
 State Senator Jerome Epstein (R) was convicted of stealing $4 million worth of oil between 1969 and 1975 while he was in office. He was sentenced to nine years in prison (1975)
 Secretary of the Treasury Joseph H. McCrane Jr. (R) was convicted of four counts of preparing false and fraudulent tax returns to hide political donations (1974)
 State Senator James Turner (R) was convicted on charges of planting drugs in the home of his Democratic opponent, Assemblyman Kenneth Gewertz in an attempt to frame and ruin him. Senator Turner got five years in prison. (1974)
 Secretary of State Robert J. Burkhardt (D) convicted of accepting $30,000 in bribes to 'fix' a bridge construction contract in 1964. He was given a suspended sentence and three years' probation. (1972)
 Secretary of State Paul J. Sherwin (D) was convicted of trying to fix a $600,000 state highway contract for a contractor who then kicked back $10,000 to Republican fund-raisers (1971)
 State Assemblyman Peter Moraites (R) pleaded guilty to two misdemeanor counts of fraud and was given a 16-month sentence. (1970)

Local 
 Mayor of Jersey City, Thomas J. Whelan (D) was indicted as a member of the "Hudson County Eight", and convicted of conspiracy and extortion concerning kickbacks for city and county contracts. (1971)
 Mayor of Jersey City, John V. Kenny (D) In 1971, he was prosecuted by the U.S. Attorney's Office for the District of New Jersey and convicted, along with the then-mayor Whelan and former City Council president Thomas Flaherty, in federal court of conspiracy and extortion in a multimillion-dollar political kickback scheme on city and county contracts.

New York 
 State Assemblyman Martin S. Auer (R) was convicted of a kickback scheme with insurance agencies (1979)
 State Senator Lloyd H. Paterson (R) convicted of 20 counts of grand larceny and five counts of falsifying business records, having embezzled more than $68,000 from private estates. He was forced to give up his seat, sentenced to five years' probation and fined $18,500 (1978)

Local 
 New York City Councilman Matthew Troy (D) pleaded guilty to a federal charge of filing a 1972 income tax return that failed to include $37,000 stolen from clients of his law practice (1976)

Oklahoma 
 Governor David Hall (D), was convicted of extortion and conspiracy and served 19 months of a three-year sentence. (1975)

Pennsylvania 
 State Senator William E. Duffield (D) was sentenced to six months in prison for 11 counts of mail fraud. (1975)
 State Senator Henry Cianfrani (D) convicted on federal charges of racketeering and mail fraud, Cianfrani was sentenced to five years in federal prison. After serving for twenty-seven months, he was released in 1980.

Local 
 Mayor of Chester, Pennsylvania John H. Nacrelli convicted of federal bribery and racketeering. (1979)

Wisconsin 
 State Representative James Lewis (R) attempted to persuade scientist Myron Muckerheide to create a laser gun "designed to blind people", and to sell it to Guatemalan Colonel Federico Fuentes. Lewis pleaded guilty to perjury for lying to a federal grand jury investigating the scheme and was removed from office. (1979)
 State Senator James Devitt (R) was found guilty of giving felony false testimony by attempting to conceal a campaign contribution. He was also removed from office. (1974)

West Virginia 
 Governor of West Virginia Wally Barron (D) was convicted of jury tampering. (1971)

1960–1969

Alabama 
 Attorney General of Alabama Richmond Flowers, Sr. (D) In 1969, Flowers was sentenced to eight years in prison for conspiring to extort payments from companies.

California

Local 
 Mayor of Oakland John C. Houlihan (R) was sent to prison for more than two years after pleading guilty to stealing nearly $100,000 from an estate he was handling as an attorney. (1966)

Maryland 
 State Delegate A. Gordon Boone (D) served 13 months in federal prison after his conviction on charges of mail fraud in connection with the state's savings and loan scandal. (1967)

Massachusetts 
 Governor's Councilors Joseph Ray Crimmins (D) and Raymond F. Sullivan (D) and former councilors Michael Favulli (D) and Ernest C. Stasiun (D) were found guilty of conspiracy for requesting bribes from Governor Foster Furcolo in exchange for their votes in favor of reappointing state public works commissioner Anthony N. DiNatale. (1965)

Michigan

Local
 Mayor of Detroit Louis Miriani (R) convicted of tax evasion. (1969)

New Jersey 
 State Senator Jerome Epstein (R) was found guilty and sentenced to nine years for stealing fuel oil, worth  $4 million. (1968)

New York 
 State Assemblyman Hyman E. Mintz (R) was convicted of bribery and perjury charges for trying to get insider information on a grand jury probe of the Finger Lakes Race Track. Mintz was sentenced to one year in prison. (1965)
 State Assemblyman Stanley J. Bauer (R) pleaded guilty to one count of tax evasion and was fined $5,000. (1962)

Oklahoma
 Associate Justice of the Oklahoma Supreme Court N. S. Corn (D) accepted bribes of $150K delivered in $100 bills in an armored car and was sentenced to 18 months in prison. (1964)

1950–1959

Illinois 
 State Auditor Orville Hodge (R) embezzled more than $6 million and was indicted on 54 counts including conspiracy, forgery and embezzling. He was sentenced to 12 to 15 years in prison. (1956)

Maine 
 State Senator Earle Albee (R), was found guilty of accepting money under false pretenses for working to have a drunk driving charge dismissed. He was sentenced to prison and an appeal was dismissed. (1957)

Texas 
 Texas Land Commissioner Bascom Giles (D) convicted of fraud and bribery and served three years of a six-year prison term.

1940–1949

Massachusetts

Local 
 Mayor of Lowell George T. Ashe (D) was convicted by a jury on charges of conspiracy involving city purchases. (1942) He was sentenced to a year in prison.
 Sheriff of Suffolk County John F. Dowd (D) pleaded guilty to charges of conspiracy and soliciting and accepting gratuities. He was sentenced to two concurrent sentences of six to eight years in prison. (1941)
 Marlborough, Massachusetts city solicitor John J. Ginnetti pled guilty to bribery for selling two jobs in the Marlborough Fire Department. Mayor Louis Ingalls, who was indicted alongside Ginnetti, committed suicide before the trial began. Ginnetti was sentenced to six months in jail and resigned from the bar. (1940)

Michigan 
 State Representative Carl F. DeLano (R) was convicted of accepting bribes from naturopathic physicians, sentenced to three to five years in prison (1945)
 State Senator William C. Birk (R) was convicted of accepting a bribe and sentenced to four years in prison. (1945)
 State Senator Jerry T. Logie (R) was tried, convicted, and sentenced to 3–5 years in prison for bribery. (1944)
 State Representative William Green (R) indicted on bribery charges, tried in 1945 and convicted; sentenced to three to five years in prison (1945)
 State Representative Warren Green Hooper (R) pleaded guilty to taking bribes and was given immunity from prosecution in return for turning state's evidence. Four days later he was shot and killed. (1945)

New Jersey

Local
 Atlantic County Treasurer Enoch L. Johnson "Nucky" (R) was involved in racketeering, gambling, prostitution and bootlegging. He was arrested for failure to file income taxes. He was found guilty and sentenced to 10 years. (1941)

New York 
 Assemblyman Lawrence J. Murray, Jr. (D) was charged with embezzling over some time a total amount of $49,102 from the accounts of a mentally incompetent client which he subsequently lost betting on horses. On April 4, 1940, he was convicted of theft, and the next day sentenced to 5 to 10 years in prison.

1930–1939

Connecticut 
 State Senator Nathan Spiro (R), pleaded guilty to accepting a bribe and was fined $1,500 (1938)

Louisiana 
 Governor Richard W. Leche (D) sentenced to 10 years in prison for fraud. (1939)

Michigan 
 State Representative Miles M. Callaghan (R) resigned his seat after pleading guilty to charges of legislative graft and conspiracy. (1939)

Pennsylvania 
 State Senator John J. McClure (R) was convicted of vice and rum running but was overturned on appeal.

1920–1929

Indiana 
 Governor of Indiana Warren McCray (R) convicted of mail fraud and served three years. (1924)

Local 
 Mayor of Indianapolis John Duvall (R) was convicted of bribery and jailed. (1928)
 Mayor of Indianapolis Claude E. Negley (R) pled guilty to accepting bribes, fined. (1927)

Massachusetts 
 State Representative C. F. Nelson Pratt (R) was found guilty of simple assault after being charged with attempted felonious assault. He was fined $100. (1928)

Oklahoma

Wisconsin
 State Assemblyman Clark M. Perry (R) pleaded guilty to a charge of liquor conspiracy and was sentenced to three years in prison. (1926)

1910–1919

Arkansas 
 State Senator Samuel C. Sims (D) was paid a bribe of $900 about legislation to regulate trading stamps and coupons. He was arrested, charged with bribery and convicted, and then expelled from the Senate. (1917)
 State Senator Ivison C. Burgess (R) introduced legislation to regulate trading stamps and coupons and then accepted a bribe of $2,000 from trading-stamp interests. Guilty of bribery, then expelled from the Senate. (1917)

California 
 State Senator Marshall Black, (R) was convicted for embezzlement of funds (1918)

Illinois

Local
 Mayor of Rock Island, Harry M. Schriver (R) was convicted of vice protection and conspiracy. (1923)

Massachusetts 
 Lawrence, Massachusetts Mayor William P. White (R) was found guilty of bribery. (1910)
 State Representative Harry C. Foster (R) was found guilty of conduct unbecoming a representative for collecting money for pending legislation (1916)

Local

New Hampshire 
 State Representative Clifford L. Snow (R) found guilty of selling his votes to other legislators(1913)

Oklahoma 
 State Insurance Commissioner Perry A. Ballard (D) was found guilty of moral turpitude and corruption. (1913)

Pennsylvania 
 Auditor General of Pennsylvania William Preston Snyder (R) was convicted of conspiracy to defraud and was given a sentence of two years in jail. (1909)
 State Superintendent of Public Grounds and Buildings James M. Shumaker (R) was convicted of conspiracy to defraud. Sentenced to two years in prison. (1908)

Vermont 
 Horace F. Graham (R) State Auditor, had just been elected governor, when he was accused of having embezzled $25,000. At trial, he was found guilty and sentenced to prison.  A new governor was elected, Republican Percival W. Clement. Though Graham still denied the crime, he repaid the missing funds. He was then pardoned by Governor Clement. (1917)

Wisconsin 
 State Assemblyman Edmund J. Labuwi (R) was convicted of obtaining money under false pretenses. (1916)

1900–1909

Kentucky 
 State Auditor Henry Eckert Youtsey (R) State Auditor, was found guilty of conspiracy in the assassination of Governor William J. Goebel (D) and was sentenced to life in prison (1900)
 Secretary of State Caleb Powers (R) was convicted as an accessory to the assassination of Democratic Governor William J. Goebel. Powers served eight years in jail. (1900) He was pardoned in 1908.

Massachusetts

Local 
 Boston Alderman George H. Battis (R) was convicted of larceny for overcharging the city of Boston $334.25 for trophies he purchased for the East Boston's Fourth of July celebrations in 1906 and 1907. He received a three-year sentence, but was pardoned by Governor Eben Sumner Draper and the Massachusetts Governor's Council after a year-and-a-half. (1909)

Michigan 
 State Representative D. Judson Hammond (R) from Oakland County, convicted of soliciting a bribe of $500 to defeat a bill opposed by wholesale grocers; sentenced to two years in prison. (1903)
 State Treasurer Frank Porter Glazier (R) convicted of embezzlement; served two years in prison (1908)

Missouri 
 State Senator William P. Sullivan (R) convicted of accepting a bribe concerning his vote on the "pure food law" and fined $100. (1905)

New York 
 State Assemblyman Max Eckmann (R) found guilty of conspiracy to manufacture false voting petitions, fined $500 (1906)

Pennsylvania 
 Treasurer of Pennsylvania, William L. Mathues (R) Mathues was convicted in connection to the Pennsylvania State Capitol graft scandal and sentenced to two years in prison. He died before incarceration. (1908)

1890–1899

Maryland 
 State Treasurer Stevenson Archer (D) was found guilty of embezzling $132,000 and sentenced to five years. (1890)

Missouri 
 State Treasurer Edward T. Noland (D), following reports of his drunkenness and gambling, an investigation found a shortage in state funds of about $32,000. He was suspended from office and resigned. He was then arrested, charged with embezzlement, tried, convicted and sentenced to two years in prison. (1890)

1880–1889

Kentucky 
 State Treasurer James "Honest Dick" Tate (D) was convicted of fraud and theft. (1888)

Louisiana 
 State Treasurer Edward A. Burke (D) was convicted of fraud and theft. (1888)

1870–1879

Mississippi 
 Lieutenant Governor Alexander K. Davis (R) was found guilty of accepting a bribe for aid in obtaining a pardon. (1876)

Nebraska 
 Governor David C. Butler (R) was found guilty of using $16,000 from the sale of public lands for his own private use. He was then impeached and removed from office. (1871)

North Carolina 
Governor William Woods Holden (R) was convicted of "unlawful" arrests and recruitment of troops to quell the activities of the Ku Klux Klan in what became known as the Kirk-Holden war. Impeached, found guilty and removed from office. (1870)

South Carolina 
 State Treasurer Francis Lewis Cardozo (R) was convicted of fraud, and spent seven months in prison. (1876)

1850–1859

Illinois 
 Governor of Illinois Joel Aldrich Matteson (D), was found to have redeemed Michigan and Illinois Canal script, which had already been redeemed. He was found guilty and forced to repay $238K. (1859)

See also 
 List of federal political scandals in the United States
 List of federal political sex scandals in the United States
 2017–18 United States political sexual scandals

Federal politicians:
 List of American federal politicians convicted of crimes
 List of United States representatives expelled, censured, or reprimanded
 List of United States senators expelled or censured

References 

 
Convicted of crimes
Lists of criminals
Politicians convicted of crimes